The Nintendo DS is a 2004 handheld video game system by Nintendo. Nintendo DS may also refer to:

Nintendo DS Lite, the second iteration, released in 2006
Nintendo DSi, the third iteration, released in 2008
Nintendo DSi XL, the fourth and final iteration, released in 2009

See also 
Nintendo 3DS, the successor to the DS, first released in 2011